Giannis Stamatakis (born 26 June 1994) is a Greek professional footballer who plays for Super League 2 club Egaleo. He plays as a central midfielder and comes from the Panathinaikos' youth ranks.

Career
On 19 October 2012, Stamatakis along with three other players, signed his first professional contract with Panathinaikos. Accidentally broke his nose in the champion cup.

Club statistics

(*includes Europa League, Champions League)
(**Superleague Greece Play-offs)

Honours
Panathinaikos
 Greek Cup: 2014

References

External links

1994 births
Living people
Greek footballers
Panathinaikos F.C. players
Super League Greece players
Association football midfielders
Panelefsiniakos F.C. players
Footballers from Central Greece
People from Phthiotis